Goran Višnjić (born 9 September 1972) is a Croatian-American actor who has appeared in American and British films and television productions. He is best known in the United States for his roles as Dr. Luka Kovač in ER and Garcia Flynn in Timeless, both NBC television series. For ER, he and the cast were nominated for two Screen Actors Guild Awards. He is the son-in-law of Croatian film director and former head of Croatian Radiotelevision (1991–95), Antun Vrdoljak. He moved to the United States in the late 1990s.

Early life
Višnjić was born on 9 September 1972 in Šibenik, SR Croatia, SFR Yugoslavia. He has one sibling, an elder brother, Joško. His father, Željko, was a bus driver, and his mother, Milka, worked in a market. He appeared in plays throughout his childhood and made his screen debut at the age of 16 in the controversial Yugoslav film, Braća po materi (1988), playing a young Ustasha.

In 1990, at the age of 18, Višnjić served one-year of obligatory military service in the Yugoslav People's Army as a paratrooper. Only weeks after his military discharge in 1991, as Yugoslavia began to dissolve, he joined the nascent Croatian Ground Army. After leaving the army, he moved to Zagreb to study at the Academy of Dramatic Art.

Career
Višnjić was the youngest actor to be chosen for the title role in Shakespeare's Hamlet at the Dubrovnik Summer Theatre Festival. Originally cast as Laertes and understudy to Hamlet, he took over the role when the star dropped out of the production shortly before the first performance. He portrayed the doomed prince from 1994 to 2000, winning several Orlando Awards (the equivalent of the Tony Award). During an episode of ER, he demonstrated his expertise in the part of Hamlet, by reciting an excerpt from the "To be, or not to be" soliloquy in Croatian.

Prior to ER, he found work in local TV productions and landed a Tuborg beer commercial that aired in Europe. Višnjić also had small speaking roles in films such as The Peacemaker, Committed and Practical Magic. In 1998, he appeared in Madonna's music video "The Power of Good-Bye", and had a cameo in the movie Rounders. It was his role as Risto, the Bosnian driver in Welcome to Sarajevo that led then-producer Jack Orman to offer him a role as a doctor to replace the departing George Clooney in the sixth season of ER in late 1999, eventually becoming the show's male lead by the start of season 12, having taken over from the departing star Noah Wyle, who left after the finale of season 11. By season 14, however, he was only making a limited number of appearances, before completely leaving the show early in season 15 (15x03: "The Book of Abby").

While starring on ER, Višnjić worked on other projects. He starred in the British film Doctor Sleep (2002), alongside Shirley Henderson and Miranda Otto. He co-starred in The Deep End; voiced Soto in Ice Age, and starred in The Last Will and Doctor Sleep. In 2004, he starred in the television miniseries Spartacus and the Croatian movie and television series Long Dark Night. He appeared with Jennifer Garner in Elektra (2005). In 2005, Višnjić was one of four finalists for the role of James Bond, eventually losing out to British actor Daniel Craig, with whom he would appear in The Girl with the Dragon Tattoo.

In 2008, Višnjić starred in the film Helen, alongside Ashley Judd as Judd's character's husband David in the drama, which made its world premiere at the 2009 Sundance Film Festival.

He appeared alongside Carla Gugino in a segment of the 2009 film New York, I Love You, an anthology set in New York. Višnjić's segment was directed by Andrey Zvyagintsev. The segment was cut from the theatrical release of the film but was included in the DVD version.

Višnjić appeared in the historical drama The Courageous Heart of Irena Sendler, about a young Polish woman who saved the lives of many Jewish children in wartime Warsaw, filmed in Riga, Latvia. It was produced for Hallmark Hall of Fame and aired on CBS on 19 April 2009. He completed a role in Mike Mills' independent film, Beginners. In late 2009, he was cast as Samson in the miniseries The Deep, shown on BBC One in 2010.

He appeared as Andrija Hebrang in the historical drama Tito on Croatian television. He later appeared in the unsold 2010 pilot of ABC's Boston's Finest, playing a disgraced cop who works with a female officer to solve crimes while trying to clear his name. In 2011, he appeared in the two-episode season three finale of the television series Leverage, as international crime financier Damien Moreau, his first guest appearance on an English-language television program. In 2011, he played Dragan Armansky, the head of a security agency, in The Girl with the Dragon Tattoo and he has signed on to play this role for the entire film trilogy produced and distributed by Sony Pictures Entertainment. He was featured on a four-episode arc of the American television series Pan Am; he played a Yugoslavian attaché to the United Nations.

In 2014, Goran played John Woods, the husband of Molly Woods, in Extant, produced by Steven Spielberg. Although the series was renewed in late 2014, Višnjić left the series early in the second season.

From 2016 to 2018, he played former NSA asset Garcia Flynn in NBC's time travel television series Timeless.

In 2019, Višnjić portrayed Ante Gotovina in the Antun Vrdoljak-directed film General. His performance, along with the film itself gained overwhelmingly negative reviews with many critics, including Milivoj Jukić and Jurica Pavičić calling his portrayal "the worst performance of his career". The critically and commercially panned film was screened at the Pula Film Festival.

Visnjic played Nikola Tesla in the twelfth series of Doctor Who, appearing in the fourth episode, "Nikola Tesla's Night of Terror", first broadcast on 19 January 2020.  In early 2020, Višnjić was cast as Count Dracula in the unsold ABC drama pilot The Brides, which was written by Roberto Aguirre-Sacasa.

Recognition
Višnjić was named People magazine's Sexiest Import in 1999 and "One of TV's Sexiest Men" in the June 5–11, 2005 TV Guide. He was ranked #18 in Croatian-based monthly film magazine Hollywood in Best Croatian Male Movie Stars of All Time list in November 2005. He was also named as the Best Croatian actor in 2004 according to the votes of the visitors of internet magazines, for his role in the movie Duga mračna noć, according to the votes of Croatian newspaper Večernji list.

Personal life

He has supported a number of medical institutions in Croatia through the donation of money and equipment. In 2008 he appeared on the nationally broadcast American benefit program Stand Up to Cancer. He served as one of the faces of ER on NBC's long-running The More You Know campaign, appearing in public service announcements discussing topics such as family time and tolerance.

His wife, Eva (born Ivana Vrdoljak), is an artist and sculptor, and the daughter of film director Antun Vrdoljak, who controversially headed Hrvatska radiotelevizija from 1991–95. The couple have two adopted children and one biological child. They reside in Los Angeles, California, and also have a home on the Croatian island of Hvar. Višnjić acknowledged paternity of a daughter, Lana Lourdes Rupić, whom he fathered in 2006 with a Croatian woman, Mirela Rupić.

In his spare time, Višnjić enjoys swimming, diving and fencing.

In September 2015, Goran and his wife announced that they had sold their home in Los Angeles for a sum of about $5 million.

He supported Croatian Democratic Union candidate Mato Franković for Mayor of Dubrovnik in the 2017 elections.

In 2021, Višnjić and his wife moved from Los Angeles to the UK.

Filmography

Film

Television

Music videos

Awards and nominations

References

External links

Goran Visnjic at Tribute.ca
 

1972 births
20th-century Croatian male actors
21st-century Croatian male actors
20th-century American male actors
21st-century American male actors
American male film actors
American male television actors
American male stage actors
American male voice actors
Croatian male film actors
Croatian male stage actors
Croatian male television actors
Croatian male voice actors
Croatian emigrants to the United States
Croatian soldiers
Living people
People from Šibenik
Military personnel of the Croatian War of Independence
Vladimir Nazor Award winners
Croatian Theatre Award winners
Golden Arena winners